The Chief of Staff of the Armed Forces of São Tomé and Príncipe is the highest-ranking military officer of in the Armed Forces of São Tomé and Príncipe, who is responsible for maintaining the operational command of the military.

List of officeholders

Commander of the Armed Forces

Chief of staff

References

 
 
 

São Tomé and Príncipe